Juhu Vashi (Pronunciation: [ʋaːʃiː]) is an upmarket residential and commercial node in Navi Mumbai, Maharashtra, across the Thane Creek of the Arabian Sea on the outskirts of city of Mumbai. The Juhu Vashi is named after the largest village Juhu Village/Vashi Gaon present in Juhu-Vashi Node.

Overview

Vashi is well-connected node of Navi Mumbai. It is also the first Navi Mumbai station after Mankhurd which is the last station of Mumbai Suburban city. Vashi is a well-organised sub-urban area that houses many commercial stores and has many residential societies. Vashi has three main and large malls, viz., Inorbit mall Vashi, Center One and Raghuleela Mall. Along with these three malls several other small shopping plazas are also developed across vashi, e.g. Satra Plaza, Vashi Plaza. Vashi is located 20 minutes away from Chembur a suburban area in Mumbai and is easily accessible by both road and railways. Vashi also is a terminal railway station for Harbour Line & Trans-Harbour Line. Vashi is well known for it cosmopolitan culture & educational institutes.

Turbhe also houses an Agricultural Produce Market Committee (APMC) market where all the grocery items, food items, Rice, Lentils, Wheet, and different types of Spices are sold at a wholesale price.

Educational institutions 
 Fr. Conceicao Rodrigues Institute of Technology
 Oriental Institute of Management
 ITM Group of Institutions
 Karmaveer Bhaurao Patil College
 Fr. Agnel Multipurpose School and Junior College
 ICLES Motilal Jhunjhunwala College, Vashi
 Sainath English High School & Rajiv Gandhi College, Vashi
 Tilak Education Society, Vashi
 Sacred Heart School, Vashi
 St. Mary’s Multipurpose High School and Junior College
 St Lawrence High School, Vashi
 OES International School

IT Companies in Vashi  

Ansha Software 

CreativeWebo Mobile App Development Company 

Cloudnayak IT Solutions

See also
 Vashi Bridge
 Vashi railway station
 Inorbit Mall in Vashi
 Raghuleela Mall, Vashi
 Satra Plaza, Vashi

References

External links

Nodes of Navi Mumbai
Suburbs of Mumbai